NGC 4500 is a barred spiral galaxy in the constellation Ursa Major. The galaxy was discovered on April 17, 1789 by William Herschel. It is a blue compact galaxy.

Its distance from Earth is approximately 50 million parsecs.

See also 
 List of galaxies
 Comet Galaxy

References

External links 
 
 Deep Sky Catalog

4500
Discoveries by William Herschel
Ursa Major (constellation)
Barred spiral galaxies
041436